Carnival Horizon is a  operated by Carnival Cruise Line.

In 2019, she and her sister ship, Carnival Vista, were both superseded as the largest Carnival ship by their sister, the  Carnival Panorama.

History

Planning and construction 
On December 19, 2014, Carnival Corporation announced a new order with Fincantieri for a second  ship to be similarly designed to her sister ship, Carnival Vista, making her the 26th vessel in the fleet.

On July 29, 2016, Carnival announced the name of its second Vista-class vessel as Carnival Horizon. Construction of the ship took 30 months, which included the steel cutting in March 2015, the keel laying in April 2016, and the sea trials in November 2017.

Delivery and christening 
On March 28, 2018, Fincantieri delivered Carnival Horizon to Carnival Cruise Line.

On March 1, 2018, Carnival announced Queen Latifah as the godmother of Carnival Horizon. She christened the vessel on May 23, 2018 upon her arrival in New York City from a 14-day transatlantic crossing.

Itinerary 

Carnival Horizon embarked on her maiden voyage on April 2, 2018 from Barcelona for a 13-day Mediterranean sailing, visiting ports of call in Italy, Croatia, Greece, and Malta. The ship continued a series of cruises for a short season in the Mediterranean before re-positioning to New York City in May for the remainder of summer 2018. From New York, she operated sailings to the Caribbean and Bermuda before re-positioning to Miami in September, where she offers year-round six-night cruises to the Western Caribbean and eight-night cruises to the Eastern and Southern Caribbean.

Incidents
On March 16, 2022, a male passenger jumped from the 11th deck into the water around 7pm after departing Grand Turk in the Turks and Caicos. The ship immediately initiated search and rescue procedures. The US Coast Guard was notified and the body of the passenger was located at approximately 9pm.

On November 15, 2019, a passenger fell four stories off a balcony to his death from a lower deck of the ship just as it was returning to Miami, Florida. The medical staff on board the ship responded to the incident; however, they could not revive him. According to the medical examiner's office, it was revealed that the passenger's death was due to blunt force trauma and not a suicide.

References

External links

 Carnival Cruise Line: Carnival Horizon official site

 

Horizon
Panamax cruise ships
Ships built by Fincantieri
Ships built in Venice
2017 ships